Matthew William Miles is an Australian veterinarian, businessman, and executive in the Australian health industry. He is the Chief Executive Officer of MS Research Australia, Australia's largest nonprofit organisation, which won the 2017 Telstra Business Awards Charity of the Year and 2017 NSW Business of the Year under Miles's stewardship.

Veterinary career 
Miles studied veterinary science at The University of Queensland from 1986-1991. Upon graduating, he spent two years in Mosman and Lane Cove working with Stephen Van Mil, an Australian veterinarian who later became a well-known television and film personality. Miles subsequently lived and worked across numerous veterinary placements in the UK before moving to Singapore in 2000 with his wife, Caroline. On returning to Sydney in 2003, he continued to practice as a veterinarian until 2007, when he decided to pursue his interest in community engagement, fundraising and disability medical research.

Medical research 
From 2007 to 2012, Miles served as Director of External Relations at the University of New South Wales (UNSW) Medicine, while obtaining a Masters of Business Administration degree there. In May 2012, he became CEO of MS Research Australia (MSRA), founded in 2004 by Simon McKeon.

He received the Harvard Club of Australia's Not for Profit Fellowship (2015); and in 2016 was shortlisted for "Not for Profit Executive of the Year" by CEO magazine.

Personal life 
Miles is the great-nephew of Sydney personality Bea Miles, the subject of numerous books and short stories (including the bestselling novel Lilian's Story, later adapted into a film starring Ruth Cracknell, Toni Collette, and Barry Otto), and a play starring Toni Lamond. Miles's grandfather, Arthur William Miles, and great-uncle, John (Jack) Miles, were owners and managers of George Street’s Peapes Menswear, a landmark gentleman's department store of the late 19th – early 20th centuries.

References 

Australian businesspeople
Living people
1968 births